Nicholas Andrew Simon, (born 21 March 1969) known professionally as Nicholas Simon, is a Hungarian-American film producer born in Rockford, Illinois, now currently residing in Bangkok, Thailand. He has been producing feature films, TV series, and commercials in Southeast Asia for two and half decades. For his work on City of Ghosts, A Prayer Before Dawn, Kong: Skull Island, Avengers: Infinity War, Simon has gained the title of “Hollywood’s man in Southeast Asia.”

Simon is known for being the founder and managing partner of two production companies, Indochina Productions and Studio Muso.

Early life and education 
An American/Hungarian dual national, Simon was born in Rockford, Illinois, and lived on a farm before moving with his family to Beloit, Wisconsin, at the age of three. He attended highschool at Phillips Academy, graduating in 1987, before obtaining a B.A. at Columbia University in 1992, specializing in Asia. 

Simon was also an active cycler, participating in the 1985 USCF Junior National Championships, the Phillips Academy Varsity Team from 1986 to 1987, and the Columbia University Team from 1991 to 1993.

In 2020, he acquired the certificate of completion for Stanford University's “Innovation and Entrepreneurship” program.

Career 
Simon arrived in Hanoi, Vietnam, via New York City in 1993 with the intent of becoming a journalist. However, he quickly realized he didn't enjoy writing and sought out other jobs. Simon eventually met the producers of Trần Anh Hùng’s Cyclo and helped out on the film in an informal capacity. In the following year, he founded Sud-Est Productions, a production company based in Vietnam. During his time, he serviced production for and co-produced numerous films, the most notable being Matt Dillon’s City of Ghosts. He sold Sud-Est Productions in 2003, and it is now a fully Vietnamese company.

While working as an independent industry consultant, Simon moved to Bangkok with his wife and daughter in 2009. In 2010, he founded Indochina Productions, which provides production services for projects in Southeast Asia. The company initially provided support for Thailand, Vietnam, Cambodia, and Laos, but now provides production services in 14 territories throughout Asia. It has since been dubbed by the NYFA as “the only company in Southeast Asia to produce and service big-budget Hollywood studio films and Fortune 500 advertising commercial needs.”

Simon has been the line producer for Indochina Productions on several major feature films, such as Spike Lee’s Da 5 Bloods and Sam Hargrave’s Extraction, and the executive producer for Indochina Productions on Hong Khaou’s Monsoon and Daniel Roby’s Target Number One. He is also known for his work as a line producer on Avengers: Infinity War and Avengers: Endgame as well as on Kong: Skull Island. Upcoming projects include adapting Jon Swain’s River of Time with Lawrence Osborne as the screenplay writer for a feature film, as well as Lawrence Osborne’s own Hunters in the Dark for the big screen.

Simon has been on the board of Luang Prabang Film Festival since 2012 and a member of the Producers Guild of America and the Production Guild UK since 2015.

In 2020, Simon also founded another production company, Studio Muso.

He has been a jurist and panelist at several industry events since 2003. He has also written op-eds for the Thai Enquirer.

Filmography

References

External links 
 IMDb Profile

1969 births
People from Rockford, Illinois
American film producers
Living people